Bergues-Saint-Winoc may refer to:
 The Abbey of Berghes-Saint-Winoc, named in honour of Saint-Winoc.
 The city of Bergues.
 The Noble family of de Berghes-Saint-Winoc.